Justice Gibbons may refer to:

Lyman Gibbons, associate justice of the Alabama Supreme Court, United States
Mark Gibbons, associate justice of the Supreme Court of Nevada, United States